Folk Tale is an album by Irish folk singer Christy Moore, released in 2011 by Sony Music.

Track listing
All tracks composed by Christy Moore; except where noted.
"Tyrone Boys" 
"Folk Tale" (Paula Meehan (poem)/Christy Moore)
"My Little Honda 50" (Tom Tuohy)
"Easter Snow" 
"Farmer Michael Hayes" (Traditional; arranged by Christy Moore)
"On Morecambe Bay" (Kevin Littlewood)
"Tiles and Slabs" (Nigel Rolfe, Christy Moore)
"Haiti" (John Spillane, Christy Moore)
"Weekend in Amsterdam" (Paul McCormack, Barney Rush)
"Ballydine" 
"God Woman"

References

2011 albums
Christy Moore albums